is a Japanese animation film from 1928. It was directed and animated by Yasuji Murata for Yokohama Cinema Shōkai.

Plot 
At the Olympic Games of animals, the most diverse species of animals compete in the sporting disciplines. Monkeys do gymnastics on the horizontal bar, bears and hippos swim and kangaroos and pigs fight against each other. In the 800 m run, a duck wins against a bulldog, a hippopotamus and a camel. A polar bear enters the pole vault and the pigs try to gain an advantage in the hurdles with balloons, but crash.

Production and Release 
The film was inspired by the 1928 Summer Olympics in Amsterdam, and was made in Yasuji Murata's film studio, Yokohama Cinema Shōkai. Murata himself was director and responsible for the animation. The work is considered his most important. The script was written by Chūzō Aochi and the animators were Koji Iida and Yukikiyo Ueno.

The film was admitted on 4 November 1928 by the Japanese Censorship Board and then presented in Japanese cinemas.

References 

1928 anime films
1928 films
1920s animated short films
Anime short films
Japanese silent films
Japanese black-and-white films
1928 short films
1920s Japanese films
Films about fictional Olympics-inspired events